The Labor Party Philippines, also known as the Workers' and Peasants' Party (WPP; this is their preferred acronym) and formerly known as the Partido ng Manggagawa at Magsasaka (lit. Workers' and Farmers' Party; PMM) and the Lapiang Manggagawa (LM), is a political party in the Philippines.

History
The Philippine Trade Union Center split into different groups, which included the Labor Party of the Philippines. Led by Cipriano Cid, Roberto Oca, Ignacio Lacsina and Felixberto Olalia, the Labor Party failed to win an election. Some members reorganized themselves into the Katipunang Manggagawang Pilipino (Association of Filipino Workers) at April 25, 1959 at the Manila Hotel with Oca as party president but other groups soon disassociated themselves from the party.

Founded on February 3, 1963 as the Lapiang Manggagawa (LM), Cipriano Cid, the founder, complained that the "party leaders were already being closely watched." The party broke up in August 1963, and its candidate for the Manila mayoralty, Roberto Oca, was recruited by the Nacionalista Party. Other members coalesced into the Liberal Party.

However, some founders from that Lyceum of the Philippines meeting persisted and carried on the "Lapiang Manggagawa" name. It was also known, albeit briefly in 1965, as the Socialist Party of the Philippines. The party registered with the Commission on Elections in 1983. The party supported the Corazon Aquino-Salvador Laurel ticket in the 1986 presidential election. In the 1992 elections, the party merged with the Lakas-NUCD. For the 1998 elections, the party merged with the Partido ng Demokratikong Reporma (Party for Democratic Reform).

For the 2010 presidential election, the party announced its nomination of Secretary of Public Works and Highways Hermogenes Ebdane for president. Ebdane accepted the nomination in November 2009, but withdrew from the presidential race in December 2009. Ebdane ran instead for the governorship of Zambales; he won, defeating Governor Amor Deloso. In 2012 Zambales' 2nd district special election, Ebdane's son Jun Omar successfully defended the district's seat in the House of Representatives of the Philippines against Deloso's daughter and from deceased Antonio M. Diaz's daughter, who ran under the Nacionalista Party.

For the 2016 presidential election, the party nominated former ambassador and House representative for OFW Family Club Roy Señeres. Señeres was in the initial list of official candidates. However, he withdrew on February 5, 2016. Seneres eventually died of a heart attack three days later. Despite his withdrawal and death, he still remained on the ballot. The party presented Apolonia Soguilon as his substitute, but was rejected because she had a different surname. Ultimately, Señeres still received around 22,000 votes in the election.

The party fielded candidates for the 2019 senatorial election. PMM's ticket consisted of Shariff Albani, Gerald Arcega, Marcelino Arias, Melchor Chavez, Jose Sonny Matula, and Luther Meniano.

The party supports Bongbong Marcos for the 2022 presidential election as cited by its unified national convention with the Partido Lakas ng Manggagawang Pilipino (PLMP) in Clark Freeport Zone, Pampanga.

Electoral performance

Presidential and vice presidential elections

Legislative elections

Local affiliates
 Sulong Zambales Party (Forward Zambales Party) – Zambales

References

Labor parties in the Philippines
Political parties established in 1963
Agrarian parties in the Philippines
1963 establishments in the Philippines